Tom Vialle (born 28 October 2000) is a French professional motocross racer, Motocross World Champion in 2020 and 2022 in MX2.

Achievements
At 11 September 2021 Vialle won 11 GP in the Motocross World Championship.

References

External links
 Tom Vialle at MXGP web site
 Tom Vialle at KTM web site

Living people
2000 births
French motocross riders
Sportspeople from Avignon